Sharon M. Cooper (born October 23, 1942) is a former registered nurse and politician. She is a Republican representing the 43rd district in Marietta, Georgia.

Early life 
On October 23, 1942, Cooper was born in Houston, Texas.

Education 
In 1968, Cooper earned a BS degree in Child Development from the University of Tennessee. In 1970, Cooper earned an MA degree in Education/Disadvantage Learners from University of South Florida. Cooper earned her BSN and MSN degrees in nursing from Medical College of Georgia.

Career 
Cooper is a former registered nurse and a medical administrator.

In 1992, Cooper was a campaign volunteer. In 1996, Cooper's political career began when she won the election for Georgia House of Representatives district 41.

Cooper is a member of the Georgia House of Representatives. Cooper is a Republican representing District 43 (was district 41), which encompasses parts of Cobb County. In 2004, Cooper became the Majority Caucus Chairperson and one of the highest ranking women politician in the Georgia House of Representatives. In 2007, Cooper became the Majority Caucus Chairman Emeritus. Cooper is also the Chairperson of the Health and Human Services Committee.

Awards 
 2000 Legislator of the Year, Georgia Republican Party.
 2014 GA Senior Living Association Legislator of the Year Award.

Personal life 
Cooper's husband was Dr. Tom Cooper (died 2013), a bariatric physician.

References

External links
Georgia House of Representatives bio
 Sharon Cooper at Georgia Society of Dermatology and Dermalogical Surgery

|-

|-

|-

Living people
Politicians from Houston
People from Cobb County, Georgia
Republican Party members of the Georgia House of Representatives
Women state legislators in Georgia (U.S. state)
21st-century American politicians
21st-century American women politicians
1942 births